The Wentnor Group is a group of rocks associated with the Longmyndian Supergroup of Precambrian age in present-day Wales, U.K.

The rocks are located within the confines between the Church Stretton Fault and the Pontesford-Lindley Lineament. The Wentnor Group is a predominantly sedimentary group with a range of facies attributable to that of a closing ocean. The Wentnor Group overlies the Stretton Group of rocks and although the units are separate, together they show a good geological progression. At the base of the Stretton Group the rocks are of basinal oceanic facies and as time goes a coarsening occurs with increased terrigenous input from the continent. Turbidites are observed and deltas form latterly with alluvial plains with occasional marine washovers. This creeps up into the Wentnor Group where alluvial plains occur latterly with fluvial and alluvial deposits noted in the uppermost (youngest) Bridges Formation.

The information below is presented oldest to youngest as it makes much more sense in this way. One should read the Stretton Group stratigraphy first in order to get a sense of continuity. The progradational Longmyndian Sequence from oldest to youngest is:
Ragleth Tuff Formation; Stretton Shale Formation; Burway Formation; Synalds Formation; Lightspout Formation; Portway Formation; Bayston-Oakswood Formation; Bridges Formation. The latter two units belong to the Wentnor Group. Below we carry on from the underlying Portway Formation (Stretton Group).

Bayston-Oakswood Formation
This is made up of fine to medium grained cross-stratified sandstone with mudstone rip-up clasts and sub-rounded lithic clasts. There are interbeds of cross-laminated finer grained sandstones with apparent upward fining successions. The formation also contains matrix and clast supported conglomerate members with subrounded lithic clasts and subangular sedimentary clasts. These are interpreted as braided fluvial deposits. (Unit is barren of fossils).

Bridges Formation
This is the top most formation of the Wentnor Group and viz. the Longmyndian Supergroup.  The unit grades up from the underlying Bayston-Oakswood Formation. The massive and cross-bedded sandstones of the underlying unit become interbedded with purple siltstones and thin ripple cross laminated sandstones. Thick cross-bedded sandstones are recorded with sharp erosional bases and are interpreted as fluvial channels running upon mud rich alluvial plain deposits.

References

External links 
 Shropshire Geology

Geology of Shropshire
Geology of Wales
Precambrian Europe